Karel Rada (born 2 March 1971) is a Czech former professional football defender. He played for several teams, including SK Slavia Prague, SK Sigma Olomouc, FK Teplice, Trabzonspor and Eintracht Frankfurt. At international level, he played for the Czech Republic, for which he played 43 matches and scored four goals. He was a participant in the Euro 1996, where the Czech Republic won the silver medal, and represented the Czech Republic at the 1997 FIFA Confederations Cup.

Career

Rada started his career with Dukla Prague.

References

External links
 

1971 births
Living people
Sportspeople from Karlovy Vary
Czech footballers
Czech Republic international footballers
Association football defenders
Bohemians 1905 players
SK Sigma Olomouc players
SK Slavia Prague players
FK Teplice players
Eintracht Frankfurt players
Trabzonspor footballers
UEFA Euro 1996 players
1997 FIFA Confederations Cup players
UEFA Euro 2000 players
Czech First League players
Süper Lig players
Bundesliga players
2. Bundesliga players
Czech expatriate footballers
Expatriate footballers in Germany
Czech expatriate sportspeople in Germany
Expatriate footballers in Turkey
Czech expatriate sportspeople in Turkey
Czech football managers
Czech Republic women's national football team managers